Dave Needham (15 August 1951 – 19 September 2008) was a British boxer. He was a Commonwealth Games gold medal winner and one of the few boxers to have held both the BBBC bantamweight and featherweight titles.

Early life and amateur career
Needham was born in Nottingham and attended Cottesmore School. He trained at the Nottingham Boxing School in Radford.

Needham won the 1969 and 1970 Amateur Boxing Association British flyweight title, when boxing out of the Nottingham School of Boxing ABC.
He represented England and won a gold medal in the flyweight division, at the 1970 British Commonwealth Games in Edinburgh, Scotland. defeating Uganda's Leo Rwabwogo in the final.

Professional career
Needham's first professional fight was on 25 January 1971 when he fought Jimmy Killeen.

His first title fight was on 10 December 1974 at the former Nottingham ice rink, when he had a points win over Paddy Maguire and became the British bantamweight champion.

He lost the bantamweight title on 20 October 1975 at Grosvenor House (World Sporting Club), Mayfair on a technical knockout (TKO) to the same Paddy Maguire.

On 20 April 1978 at the World Sporting Club, Piccadilly. Needham won the title of British featherweight champion when he defeated Alan Richardson on points.

On 16 December 1978 in Leon, Spain, he fought for the EBU featherweight title, but lost on a TKO to Roberto Castanon.

Needham lost the featherweight title on 6 November 1979 at the Royal Albert Hall when he was defeated by Pat Cowdell on points.

His last fight was on 29 May 1979 at Wolverhampton Civic Hall against Pat Cowdell for the British featherweight title. Cowdell won on a TKO.

Retirement
Needham retired aged 29 in 1980, after becoming disillusioned with the sport. He went on to run a motorcycle dealership with his brother.He spent the last couple of years of his life in Thailand. Needham died in Chonburi hospital from liver problems.  He was 57.

See also
 List of British bantamweight boxing champions
 List of British featherweight boxing champions

References

External links

1951 births
2008 deaths
English male boxers
Boxers from Nottingham
Flyweight boxers
Featherweight boxers
Bantamweight boxers
Boxers at the 1970 British Commonwealth Games
Commonwealth Games gold medallists for England
English expatriates in Thailand
Commonwealth Games medallists in boxing
Dave Needham
Medallists at the 1970 British Commonwealth Games